The sixth and final season of Packed to the Rafters, an Australian television drama series, premiered on 23 April 2013 on the Seven Network. The series is made up of only 12 episodes. The reduction of episodes is due to the series making way for Winners & Losers later in the year.

Cast

Regular
 Rebecca Gibney as Julie Rafter
 Erik Thomson as Dave Rafter
 Angus McLaren as Nathan Rafter
Hannah Marshall as Retta Schembri-Karandonis
 George Houvardas as Carbo Karandonis
 Brooke Satchwell as Frankie Calasso
Jacob Allan as Matt Jennings
Zoe Cramond as Emma MacKey
Ben Mingay as Fergus "Buzz" Graham
Merridy Eastman as Donna MacKey
 Michael Caton as Ted Taylor
 Fiona Spence as Eleanor McCormack (8 episodes)
 Ryan Corr as Coby Jennings (4 episodes)
 Jessica McNamee as Sammy Westaway (4 episodes)
 Hugh Sheridan as Ben Rafter (2 episodes)
 Jessica Marais as Rachel Rafter (1 episode)
 James Stewart as Jake Barton (1 episode)

Recurring and guest
Hannah & Sabella Storey as Ruby Rafter
Lauren Clair as Saskia Clark Rafter
 Jacinta Stapleton as Carla Calasso
 Sarah Chadwick as Trish Westaway
Tom O'Sullivan as Craig/Logan
Harry & Leo Lucas as Edward Rafter
 Molly Meldrum as himself
Narek Arman as Jackson Radovich
Julie Hamilton as Louise Taylor

Casting
Hugh Sheridan is committed to at least two episodes. Jessica McNamee will also return in season 6 as Sammy Westaway. Jessica Marais will briefly reprise her role of Rachel Rafter in season six. Fiona Spence joined the cast as Eleanor McCormack.

Production
Packed to the Rafters was renewed for a sixth season on 16 May 2012.  The reduced number of episodes meant less filming for the cast, however rumours began to circulate that the show had been axed when the Rafter house went up for sale.  However, the house failed to sell.

It was announced in TV Week that the sixth season of Packed to the Rafters would be the last, with Hugh Sheridan stating: "It's emotional letting go of Rafters – for all of us. It was such an amazing chapter in Aussie TV. I'm really proud we all came back together to send it off."  The series finale of Rafters will air later in 2013. However, Channel Seven revealed that scripts for the seventh season are in development and that while Frankie, Buzz, Coby and Ben won't be back, Julie definitely will be.  A spokesperson also announced that there is no way they would bring such a wonderful story to a close.

It was later confirmed by TV Week that Packed to the Rafters has been cancelled and would finish in July with a big two-hour season finale, which would see the return of Hugh Sheridan, Jessica Marais, Ryan Corr, Jessica McNamee and James Stewart.  Rebecca Gibney said, "The cast, writers and producers have always said that we wanted to keep Rafters as one of the most-watched shows on TV.  If we ever felt like we were losing too many cast members, we needed to end it on a high.  We can say season six winds up an aspect of the Rafter family and there is a sense of finality to it."

It was later said that while Packed to the Rafters is dead as a series, it will definitely return.  While the format in which it will return is currently unknown, it is speculated to be several 90-minute telemovies or a 6-part miniseries.  A Channel Seven spokesperson told The Age, "The series is expected to end in July and a new storyline nutted out, with no production expected to take place for at least a year.  The actors will be given a prolonged break to pursue other projects."  It is understood that the setting for Packed to the Rafters will change quite significantly to move the family's story forward.

Episodes

{| class="wikitable plainrowheaders" style="margin: auto; width: 100%"
|-style="color:white"
!! style="background-color:#A1176C; color: #fff; text-align: center;" width=5%|No. inseries
!! style="background-color:#A1176C; color: #fff; text-align: center;" width=5%|No. inseason
!! style="background-color:#A1176C; color: #fff; text-align: center;" width=20%|Title
!! style="background-color:#A1176C; color: #fff; text-align: center;" width=15%|Narrator
!! style="background-color:#A1176C; color: #fff; text-align: center;" width=15%|Directed by
!! style="background-color:#A1176C; color: #fff; text-align: center;" width=25%|Written by
!! style="background-color:#A1176C; color: #fff; text-align: center;" width=140|Original air date
!! style="background-color:#A1176C; color: #fff; text-align: center;" width=5%|Australian viewers
|-

|}

Reception

Ratings

References

2013 Australian television seasons